The Arabian pipistrelle (Hypsugo arabicus) is a species of vesper bat in the family Vespertilionidae. It is found only in Iran and Oman.

Taxonomy and etymology
It was described as a new species in 1979 by David L. Harrison. Its species name "arabicus" is Latin for "Arabic."

Description
Harrison described it as "one of the smallest Arabian bats."

Biology and ecology
It is insectivorous, consuming Auchenorrhynchans, beetles, and hymenopterans.

Range and habitat
The species is found in the Arabian Peninsula and Western Asia. It was first documented in Oman. A 2002 study noted that the species had been documented in Iran.

Conservation
As of 2019, it is evaluated as data deficient by the IUCN. Its population size and trends are unknown. While its extent of occurrence—spanning Iran to Oman—is relatively large, it is possible that its area of occurrence could be much smaller. In 1996, it had been categorized as vulnerable.

References

Hypsugo
Taxonomy articles created by Polbot
Bats of the Arabian Peninsula
Mammals described in 1979